The Paulson Institute is a non-partisan, independent “think and do tank” dedicated to fostering a US-China relationship that serves to maintain global order in a rapidly evolving world. Founded in 2011 by former Treasury Secretary Henry M. Paulson, Jr., the Institute is based in Chicago with offices in Washington and Beijing.

The Institute's focus on US-China is dictated by the reality that it is the most consequential bilateral relationship in the world. The Paulson Institute often operates at the intersection of economics, financial markets, environmental protection, and policy advocacy, in part by promoting balanced and sustainable economic growth. 

The Institute produces leading analysis and intellectual products to decode China’s political economy. It advocates for market and nature-based solutions to climate change and environmental conservation. It works with financial markets and international financial institutions to implement green lending standards. And it convenes thought leaders to generate new thinking and to help build a new framework on US-China policy.

One of its initiatives is MacroPolo, which describes itself as "the in-house think tank of the Paulson Institute in Chicago. We decode China’s economic arrival with our incisive, market-relevant analysis and creative research products. ... Instead of long research papers, we specialize in thoughtfully designed digital interactives as well as dynamic content and databases.  ... Our work spans three core areas: economics, technology, and politics."

Vice Chairman, Deborah Lehr, expects there to be a change of style in US-China relations under President Joe Biden, the change of style coming initially more in the form of tone rather than in substance, and that President Biden will eventually lay down the groundwork for a more consistent approach in US policies toward China, in trade, in technology and in national-security related issues. Lehr foresees that there will continue to be constraints in coordinating the US policy on China.

References

External links 
 

University of Chicago
2011 establishments in Illinois